William Harris is a New York City, United States, based television executive currently serving as Senior Vice-President of Production and Broadcast Operations for the A&E Television Networks, which includes cable services A&E, The History Channel, The Biography Channel, Crime and Investigation, History en Espanol, The Military History Channel and History International.

Harris, a primary agent in the growth and development of the channel's Biography series, has received a number of awards for his documentary work.

Footnotes

References
 GPFO presents Connecting the Docs with Bill Harris. Greater Philadelphia Film Office. Accessed 2011-01-17.
 A&E Television Networks. American Executive Magazine. Accessed 2011-01-17.

American television executives
Living people
Year of birth missing (living people)